Earthquake simulation applies a real or simulated vibrational input to a structure that possesses the essential features of a real seismic event.  Earthquake simulations are generally performed to study the effects of earthquakes on man-made engineered structures, or on natural features which may present a hazard during an earthquake.

Dynamic experiments on building and non-building structures may be physical – as with shake-table testing – or virtual (based on computer simulation).  In all cases, to verify a structure's expected seismic performance, researchers prefer to deal with so called 'real time-histories' though the last cannot be 'real' for a hypothetical earthquake specified by either a building code or by some particular research requirements.

Shake-table testing 
Studying a building's response to an earthquake is performed by putting a model of the structure on a shake-table that simulates the seismic loading. The earliest such experiments were performed more than a century ago.

Computational approaches 
Another way is to evaluate the earthquake performance analytically. 
The very first earthquake simulations were performed by statically applying some horizontal inertia forces, based on scaled peak ground accelerations, to a mathematical model of a building. With the further development of computational technologies, static approaches began to give way to dynamic ones.

Traditionally, numerical simulation and physical tests have been uncoupled and performed separately.  So-called hybrid testing systems employ rapid, parallel analyses using both physical and computational tests.

See also 
Seismic analysis

References

External links
Network for Earthquake Engineering Simulation (NEES)
AEM Earthquake Simulation

Building
Earthquake engineering